The 2005 South American Under-17 Football Championship was a football competition for U-17 national teams affiliated with CONMEBOL. It was the 11th time the tournament was held. It was played in Venezuela from 1 to 17 April 2005.

The host city of the competition was Maracaibo.

Squads

First round
The 10 national teams were divided in 2 groups of 5 teams each. The top 2 teams qualified for the final round.

Group A

Group B

Final round
The final round were played in the same system that first round, with the best 4 teams.

Brazil and Uruguay qualify to FIFA U-17 World Cup, Peru '05

Top goalscorers

South American Under-17 Football Championship
Under
International association football competitions hosted by Venezuela
2004–05 in Venezuelan football
2005 in youth association football